Maurice McLaughlin (1924 – June 27, 2000) was an American politician. He served as a Democratic member of the Florida House of Representatives. McLaughlin also served as a member for the 39th district of the Florida Senate.

McLaughlin worked as a funeral director.  He was mayor of Fort Walton Beach, Florida and a member of the Walton Beach City Council for two years.  In 1962, he was elected to the Florida House of Representatives. McLaughlin succeeded politician, Jack C. Nichols. In 1965 McLaughlin left office to serve for the 39th district of the Florida Senate. He served until 1966.

McLaughlin died in June 2000 of heart failure at a hospital in Pensacola, Florida, at the age of 76.

References 

1924 births
2000 deaths
Democratic Party Florida state senators
Democratic Party members of the Florida House of Representatives
20th-century American politicians
American funeral directors
Mayors of places in Florida